On 6 March 2023, a terrorist attack occurred in Bolan, Balochistan province, Pakistan. The attack targeted a van carrying police officers from Sibi back to Quetta, killing at least nine and injuring 13. The attacker, believed to be a suicide bomber riding a motorcycle, rammed into the police van on the Kambri bridge in the area between Sibi and Kachhi districts. No group has claimed responsibility for the attack.

The injured had been transported to Sibi Civil Hospital. Bomb disposal squads and security personnel have arrived at the site, and the area has been cordoned off with a search operation underway. The Balochistan Information Department issued a statement saying that injured officers had been transported to Quetta from Bolan via a government helicopter.

Mir Abdul Qudoos Bizenjo condemned the attack, vowing to make all conspiracies to create unrest and instability in the province unsuccessful with the public's support.

Prime Minister Shehbaz Sharif also condemned the incident, promising to rid the country of the menace of terrorism.

References

2023 in Balochistan, Pakistan
2023 murders in Pakistan
2020s crimes in Balochistan, Pakistan
March 2023 crimes in Asia
March 2023 events in Pakistan
Terrorist incidents in Pakistan in 2023
Suicide bombings in Balochistan, Pakistan
Suicide bombings in 2023
Motorcycle bombings
Crimes against police officers in Pakistan
Kachhi District